Syngonanthus is a genus of plant in family Eriocaulaceae. It is native to tropical Africa and to Latin America (from Mexico and Cuba south to Argentina).

 Syngonanthus acephalus Hensold - Amazonas State in Venezuela
 Syngonanthus albopulvinatus (Moldenke) Moldenke - Venezuela
 Syngonanthus allenii Moldenke - Colombia, Amazonas State in Brazil
 Syngonanthus amapensis Moldenke - Colombia, Venezuela, northwestern Brazil
 Syngonanthus amazonicus Moldenke - Colombia, Venezuela, northwestern Brazil
 Syngonanthus androsaceus (Griseb.) Ruhland - Cuba
 Syngonanthus angolensis H.E.Hess - Angola, Zaïre, Zambia, Tanzania, Malawi
 Syngonanthus anomalus (Körn.) Ruhland - Colombia, Venezuela, northern Brazil, Ecuador, the Guianas
 Syngonanthus anthemidiflorus (Bong.) Ruhland - Brazil, Misiones Province of Argentina
 Syngonanthus appressus (Körn.) Ruhland  - central and southern Brazil
 Syngonanthus aquaticus Silveira - Minas Gerais
 Syngonanthus arenarius (Gardner) Ruhland - Minas Gerais
 Syngonanthus atrovirens (Körn.) Ruhland - Minas Gerais
 Syngonanthus auripes Silveira - Bahia, Goiás
 Syngonanthus bartlettii Moldenke - Belize
 Syngonanthus bellus Moldenke - Venezuela, northern Brazil
 Syngonanthus bianoensis Kimp. - Zaïre
 Syngonanthus bicolor Silveira - Minas Gerais
 Syngonanthus biformis (N.E.Br.) Gleason - Colombia, Venezuela, northern Brazil, Peru, the Guianas
 Syngonanthus bisumbellatus (Steud.) Ruhland - Colombia, Venezuela, Guyana, Pará, Piauí
 Syngonanthus blackii Moldenke - Pará
 Syngonanthus bracteosus Moldenke - Minas Gerais
 Syngonanthus cabralensis Silveira - Minas Gerais
 Syngonanthus cachimboensis Moldenke - Pará
 Syngonanthus canaliculatus Silveira - Minas Gerais
 Syngonanthus capillaceus Silveira - Minas Gerais
 Syngonanthus caulescens (Poir.) Ruhland - State of Veracruz in Mexico; Costa Rica, Venezuela, Colombia, the Guianas, Peru, Brazil, Bolivia, Argentina, Paraguay, Uruguay	
 Syngonanthus chapadensis Silveira - Minas Gerais
 Syngonanthus chrysanthus (Bong.) Ruhland - southeastern Brazil
 Syngonanthus costatus Ruhland - Minas Gerais
 Syngonanthus cowanii Moldenke - southeastern Colombia, Amazonas State in Venezuela
 Syngonanthus crassinervius Silveira - Minas Gerais
 Syngonanthus cuyabensis (Bong.) Giul., Hensold & L.R.Parra - Brazil, Bolivia, Venezuela, Colombia, Guyana, Suriname
 Syngonanthus davidsei Huft - Chiapas
 Syngonanthus decorus Moldenke - Goiás
 Syngonanthus densiflorus (Körn.) Ruhland  - Peru, Brazil, Bolivia
 Syngonanthus densus (Körn.) Ruhland  - Brazil
 Syngonanthus diamantinensis Silveira - Minas Gerais
 Syngonanthus dichroanthus Hensold - Goiás
 Syngonanthus duidae Moldenke - Venezuela
 Syngonanthus egleri Moldenke - Pará
 Syngonanthus elegans Ruhland - Minas Gerais, Brazil
 Syngonanthus exilis S.M.Phillips - Zambia
 Syngonanthus fenestratus Hensold - Venezuela, northern Brazil, Guyana
 Syngonanthus ferrensis Silveira - Minas Gerais
 Syngonanthus filipes Silveira - Minas Gerais
 Syngonanthus fischerianus (Bong.) Ruhland  - Brazil, Bolivia
 Syngonanthus flaviceps Silveira - Minas Gerais
 Syngonanthus flavidulus (Michx.) Ruhland - southeastern USA (Alabama, Florida, Georgia, North and South Carolina)
 Syngonanthus fuscescens Ruhland - Minas Gerais
 Syngonanthus garimpensis Silveira - Minas Gerais
 Syngonanthus glandulifer Silveira - Minas Gerais
 Syngonanthus goyazensis (Körn.) Ruhland - Goiás, Minas Gerais
 Syngonanthus gracilis (Bong.) Ruhland - Colombia, Venezuela, northern Brazil, Peru, the Guianas, Bolivia, Paraguay, Uruguay
 Syngonanthus grao-mogolensis Silveira - Minas Gerais
 Syngonanthus helminthorrhizus (Mart. ex Körn.) Ruhland - Brazil, Paraguay
 Syngonanthus heteropeploides Herzog - Venezuela, northern Brazil, Guyana
 Syngonanthus heterotrichus Silveira - Minas Gerais
 Syngonanthus hirtellus Ruhland - Minas Gerais
 Syngonanthus hondurensis Moldenke - Belize
 Syngonanthus humbertii Moldenke - Madagascar
 Syngonanthus humboldtii (Kunth) Ruhland - Colombia, Venezuela, northern Brazil, the Guianas
 Syngonanthus hygrotrichus Ruhland - Minas Gerais
 Syngonanthus insularis Moldenke - Isla de la Juventud in Cuba
 Syngonanthus inundatus (Körn.) Ruhland - Goiás
 Syngonanthus itambeensis Silveira - Minas Gerais
 Syngonanthus lagopodioides (Griseb.) Ruhland - Cuba
 Syngonanthus lanatus Moldenke - Brazil
 Syngonanthus lanceolatus Silveira - Minas Gerais
 Syngonanthus laricifolius (Gardner) Ruhland - Brazil
 Syngonanthus latifolius (Moldenke) Hensold - Mato Grosso
 Syngonanthus leprieurii (Körn.) Ruhland - Pará, French Guiana, Venezuela
 Syngonanthus lisowskii Kimp - Zaïre
 Syngonanthus llanorum Ruhland - Colombia; Apure State in Venezuela
 Syngonanthus longibracteatus Kimp - Zaïre, Tanzania, Zambia, Zimbabwe, Mozambique
 Syngonanthus longipes Gleason - Brazil, Venezuela, Colombia, Guyana, Suriname
 Syngonanthus lundellianus Moldenke - Belize
 Syngonanthus macrocephalus (Moldenke) Hensold - Cerro Sipapo in Venezuela
 Syngonanthus macrolepis Silveira - Minas Gerais
 Syngonanthus manikaensis Kimp - Zaïre
 Syngonanthus marginatus Silveira - Minas Gerais
 Syngonanthus micropus Silveira - São Paulo
 Syngonanthus minutifolius Silveira - Minas Gerais
 Syngonanthus minutulus (Steud.) Moldenke - Pará, Minas Gerais
 Syngonanthus minutus (Moldenke) Hensold - Auyán-tepui in Venezuela
 Syngonanthus multipes Silveira - Minas Gerais
 Syngonanthus mwinilungensis S.M.Phillips - Zambia
 Syngonanthus nanus Moldenke - Paraná
 Syngonanthus ngoweensis Lecomte - Zaïre, Congo-Brazzaville, Angola
 Syngonanthus niger Silveira - Minas Gerais
 Syngonanthus nigroalbus Silveira - Minas Gerais
 Syngonanthus nitens (Bong.) Ruhland - Brazil, Paraguay, Bolivia, Peru, Colombia, Venezuela
 Syngonanthus oblongus (Körn.) Ruhland - Brazil, Colombia, Venezuela
 Syngonanthus oneillii Moldenke - Belize
 Syngonanthus ottohuberi Hensold - Amazonas State in Venezuela
 Syngonanthus pakaraimensis Moldenke - Venezuela, Guyana
 Syngonanthus paleaceus S.M.Phillips - Zambia
 Syngonanthus pallens Silveira - Minas Gerais
 Syngonanthus pauciflorus Silveira - Minas Gerais
 Syngonanthus peruvianus Ruhland  - Peru
 Syngonanthus philcoxii Moldenke - Mato Grosso
 Syngonanthus philodicoides (Körn.) Ruhland - Bahia, Goiás
 Syngonanthus pittieri Moldenke - Panama
 Syngonanthus planus Ruhland  - Bahia, Minas Gerais
 Syngonanthus plumosus Silveira - Minas Gerais
 Syngonanthus poggeanus Ruhland  - Burundi, Zaïre, Congo-Brazzaville, Angola, Zambia
 Syngonanthus pulchellus Moldenke - Minas Gerais
 Syngonanthus pulcher (Körn.) Ruhland - Goiás, Minas Gerais
 Syngonanthus pulvinellus Moldenke - Minas Gerais
 Syngonanthus quadrangularis Silveira - Minas Gerais
 Syngonanthus reclinatus (Körn.) Ruhland - Brazil
 Syngonanthus restingensis Hensold & A.L.R.Oliveira - Bahia, Rio de Janeiro
 Syngonanthus retrorsociliatus Silveira - Minas Gerais
 Syngonanthus retrorsus Silveira - Minas Gerais
 Syngonanthus rhizonema Ruhland - São Paulo
 Syngonanthus robinsonii Moldenke - Zaïre, Zambia
 Syngonanthus schlechteri Ruhland - Zaïre, Gabon, Congo-Brazzaville, Tanzania
 Syngonanthus schwackei Ruhland - eastern Brazil
 Syngonanthus sclerophyllus Ruhland - Goiás
 Syngonanthus setifolius Hensold - northern Brazil, Venezuela
 Syngonanthus sickii Moldenke - Pará
 Syngonanthus simplex (Miq.) Ruhland - Colombia, Venezuela, northern Brazil, the Guianas
 Syngonanthus sinuosus Silveira - Minas Gerais
 Syngonanthus spadiceus (Körn.) Ruhland - Piauí, Minas Gerais
 Syngonanthus spongiosus Hensold - Amazonas State of Brazil
 Syngonanthus surinamensis Moldenke - Suriname
 Syngonanthus tenuipes Silveira - Minas Gerais
 Syngonanthus tenuis (Kunth) Ruhland - Colombia, Venezuela, northern Brazil
 Syngonanthus tiricensis Moldenke - Bolívar State in Venezuela
 Syngonanthus trichophyllus Moldenke - Colombia, Venezuela, northern Brazil, Guyana
 Syngonanthus umbellatus (Lam.) Ruhland - Dominican Republic, Colombia, Venezuela, northern Brazil, the Guianas
 Syngonanthus upembaensis Kimp - Zaïre
 Syngonanthus verticillatus (Bong.) Ruhland  - Goiás, Minas Gerais
 Syngonanthus wahlbergii (Wikstr. ex Körn.) Ruhland - from Nigeria east to Tanzania, south to northern South Africa
 Syngonanthus weddellii Moldenke - Pará, Goiás
 Syngonanthus welwitschii (Rendle) Ruhland - Zaïre, Sierra Leone, Tanzania, Angola, Zambia
 Syngonanthus widgrenianus (Körn.) Ruhland  - eastern Brazil
 Syngonanthus williamsii (Moldenke) Hensold - Colombia, Venezuela, northern Brazil
 Syngonanthus xinguensis Moldenke - Mato Grosso
 Syngonanthus yacuambensis Moldenke - Ecuador

References

Eriocaulaceae
Poales genera
Taxonomy articles created by Polbot